Chronic allograft nephropathy (CAN) is a kidney disorder which is the leading cause of kidney transplant failure, occurring months to years after the transplant.

Symptoms and signs
CAN is characterized by a gradual decline in kidney function and, typically, accompanied by high blood pressure and hematuria.

Pathology
The histopathology is characterized by interstitial fibrosis, tubular atrophy,
fibrotic intimal thickening of arteries and glomerulosclerosis.

Diagnosis
CAN is diagnosed by examination of tissue, e.g. a kidney biopsy.

References

Organ transplantation
Kidney diseases